Keene is an unincorporated community in central Keene Township, Coshocton County, Ohio, United States.  It has a post office with the ZIP code 43828.

History
Keene was laid out in 1820. A large share of the early settlers being natives of Keene, New Hampshire, caused the name to be selected. A post office called Keene has been in operation since 1825.

References

Unincorporated communities in Ohio
Unincorporated communities in Coshocton County, Ohio